"New Thang" is a song by American singer, dancer, DJ and rapper Redfoo, also known for being half of the duo LMFAO. It was released as the first single from his debut solo studio album Party Rock Mansion on August 6, 2014. The song, written and produced by himself, peaked at number 3 on the Australian Singles Chart. In 2020, the song went viral on TikTok, being used in many videos.

Music video
The music video for this song was released on August 24, 2014, via Redfoo's YouTube account, The video was shot in Santa Clarita and features an array of women in vibrant, neon colours and Sergio Flores shirtless, playing the saxophone.

Redfoo said of the video: "It will always have a bit of humour and the sexiness. I might not be curing cancer but what I am doing is consciously doing my best to spread happiness as an entertainer. I want to make people feel good."

Promotion
Redfoo performed the song live on The X Factor Australia's result show on September 1, where he is also a judge/mentor.

Official remixes
 Acapella and Sax Stem (4:38)
 The Works and Redfoo Remix (4:22)
 DJ Soda Remix (4:52)

Charts and certifications

Weekly charts

Year-end charts

Certifications

References

External links
 Official music video on YouTube

2014 singles
2014 songs
Interscope Records singles
Redfoo songs
Song recordings produced by Play-N-Skillz
Songs written by Redfoo